The 1987 Irish Masters was the thirteenth edition of the professional invitational snooker tournament, which took place from 24 to 29 March 1987. The tournament was played at Goffs in Kill, County Kildare, and featured twelve professional players.

Steve Davis won the title for the third time, beating Willie Thorne 9–1 in the final.

Main draw

References

1987 in snooker
Irish Masters
1987 in Irish sport